Can Yaman (born 8 November 1989) is a Turkish actor. He received a Golden Butterfly Award for Best Actor in a Romantic Comedy in 2018 for his role in Erkenci Kuş as well as Murex d'Or in 2019. In 2020, he received an international PRODU2020 nomination and in 2021, a nomination for Best Actor in a Romantic Comedy at Golden Butterfly Awards for his role in the series Mr. Wrong. Yaman has also starred in the TV shows Gönül İşleri, İnadına Aşk, Hangimiz Sevmedik, and Dolunay. He also won the 7th GQ Man of the Year Award 2019 as well as several international awards for his charitable initiatives.

Life
Yaman was born on 8 November 1989 in Istanbul, Turkey. His paternal grandfather is Kosovo-Albanian from Kosovo. His paternal grandmother is Albanian from North Macedonia. He is the nephew of football coach Fuat Yaman. From an early age, Yaman's grandmothers were involved hands-on in his upbringing and care due to financial difficulties which his parents experienced. Yaman's parents divorced when he was five years old.

Yaman studied at Bilfen College for first and middle school, then studied at the Liceo Italiano di Istanbul, where he finished as a top student with the highest grade since existence of the educational establishment. Yaman is fluent in several languages: Turkish, Italian, English, German, and  also speaks Spanish.

In 2012, he graduated from the Law Department of Yeditepe University, and began working at PricewaterhouseCoopers, where he met his current law firm partners. By the time he was 24, Yaman was working in mergers and acquisitions and writing articles for the tax section of Dünya newspaper. As he was finding success in the corporate law sector, he was also realizing that corporate life was not for him. Yaman told Hello! magazine in 2018, "I felt like having an open view but sitting in an office and wearing a suit bothered me a lot. When they gave me an annual leave, I left without coming back. It was on TV that my colleagues saw me next." While on summer leave from work, Yaman travelled to Bodrum where he met his eventual and current acting managers, Cüneyt Sayıl and İlker Bilgi.

Career 
Yaman started his career in Gönül İşleri  in 2014. In 2015, he starred in İnadına Aşk and starred in Hangimiz Sevmedik in 2016. The breakthrough of his career came in 2017 with the series Dolunay.

From 2018 to 2019, he played one of the lead roles "Can Divit” in the Turkish romantic comedy series Erkenci Kuş (Daydreamer) opposite Demet Özdemir. He received several acting national awards and nominations including international Murex d'Or award for this series.

Υaman played the lead role Özgür Atasoy in the Turkish short series Bay Yanlış (Mr. Wrong). The series is produced by Gold Film, directed by Deniz Yorulmazer, with a script by Aslı Zengin and Banu Zengin Tak. It premiered on FOX in June 2020. For this series Yaman was nominated for Best Actor in Foreign Series at LATAM PRODU 2020 Awards.

Filmography

Television

Web series

Commercial

Music video

Awards

References

External links
 
 Can Yaman Mania

Living people
1989 births
Male actors from Istanbul
Yeditepe University alumni
Golden Butterfly Award winners
Turkish male television actors
Turkish male film actors
21st-century Turkish male actors
Turkish people of Kosovan descent
Turkish people of Macedonian descent
Turkish people of Albanian descent
Turkish male models